The 1991 CONCACAF Gold Cup Final was a soccer match played on July 7, 1991, at the Memorial Coliseum in Los Angeles, to determine the winner of the 1991 CONCACAF Gold Cup. United States beat Honduras 4–3 on penalties after the game finished 0–0 after extra time. This was the United States' first major title. It was also the first ever Gold Cup Final and first to be decided by a penalty shoot-out. As Gold Cup champion, the United States represented CONCACAF at the 1992 King Fahd Cup in Saudi Arabia.

Route to the final

Match details

References

External links
Official website

Final
CONCACAF Gold Cup finals
CONCACAF Gold Cup Final 1991
United States men's national soccer team matches
Honduras national football team matches
CONCACAF Gold Cup Final
CONCACAF Gold Cup Final
CONCACAF Gold Cup Final
CONCACAF Gold Cup Final
CONCACAF Gold Cup Final
Exposition Park (Los Angeles neighborhood)